The BMW M21 is a straight-six diesel engine developed by the Bavarian engine manufacturer BMW. It has swirl chamber injection and is based on the M20 petrol engine and was produced for BMW by the Upper Austrian Steyr engine plant from 1983 to 1991. It was succeeded by the M51.

Background 

In the 1970s BMW decided to develop an engine, which would both be powerful and have a good fuel economy. This was caused by the oil crisis in 1973. In 1975 a group of BMW engineers started working on the M21 diesel engine, the M20 petrol engine was used as the basis. The Steyr engine plant was planned from the beginning to be the sole manufacturer of the new diesel engine. It started as a joint venture with Steyr-Daimler Puch in 1978, but in February 1982 BMW took over the reins. The first engines built there (in early 1982) were six-cylinder petrol units. Beginning in 1983, Ford was planning to buy 190,000 BMW turbodiesels over a period of several years. With the American diesel market imploding in the early 1980s, Ford only built a small number of Lincolns thus equipped and only for two model years. 

In 1983 at the IAA, the first passenger car was shown to the public which made use of the  M21. This 5-series BMW was the fastest series production diesel car in the world in 1983.

Technical description 

As per the M20, the M21 is water-cooled, has a cast iron block and a SOHC valvetrain. The camshaft is driven by a belt, each cylinder has one inlet and one outlet valve. Compared to the M20, the M21 has reinforced connecting rods, cylinder heads, pistons, valves and a reinforced crankshaft with seven bearings.

For faster engine startup the M21 has a glowplug system called instant start, which reduces the time to reach starting temperature compared to similar diesel engines. The fuel is injected into swirl chambers.

A Garrett turbocharger is used (without an intercooler). Initially, the M21 was only available as a turbocharged engine. In 1985, BMW introduced a naturally aspirated version of the M21, which was popular in countries with a high motor vehicle tax.

Initially, the fuel pump was controlled mechanically. The updated engine has a smaller turbocharger, which improves response.

Models 

Applications:
 1983 - 1988 E28 524td
 1985 - 1988 E28 524d (naturally aspirated)
 1985 - 1993 E30 324d (naturally aspirated)
 1985 - 1993 E30 324td
 1988 - 1991 E34 524td
 1984 - 1985 Continental Mark VII
 1984 - 1985 Lincoln Continental
 1986 - 1987 Vixen 21 TD and Vixen 21 XC
 1989 - 1991 Bertone Freeclimber
 1992 UMM Alter II (four examples built)

See also

 List of BMW engines

References 

M21
Diesel engines by model
Straight-six engines